Donna Lee is an album by American saxophonist and composer Anthony Braxton recorded in 1972 and originally released on the French America label.

Reception
The Allmusic review awarded the album 4 stars.

Track listing
All compositions by Anthony Braxton except where noted.
 "Donna Lee" (Miles Davis) - 9:14 
 "H-204 3=HF G Composition No - 23L" - 12:03 
 "You Go to My Head Part 1" (J. Fred Coots, Haven Gillespie) - 6:21 
 "You Go to My Head Part 2" (Coots, Gillespie) - 10:18 
 "60666 C -66M Composition 23K" - 5:15 
Recorded at Studio Decca in Paris, France, on February 18, 1972

Personnel
Anthony Braxton – alto saxophone  
Michael Smith - piano
Peter Warren - bass
Oliver Johnson - drums

References

America Records albums
Anthony Braxton albums
1972 albums